Ju-Lee Kim (born 1969) is a South Korean mathematician who works as a professor of mathematics at the Massachusetts Institute of Technology (MIT). Her research involves the representation theory of p-adic groups.

Education and career
Kim completed her undergraduate studies at KAIST in 1991, and earned a Ph.D. from Yale University in 1997 supervised by Roger Howe; at Yale, she was also mentored by Ilya Piatetski-Shapiro.

After postdoctoral study at the Institute for Advanced Study and the École Normale Supérieure, she joined the faculty as an assistant professor at the University of Michigan in 1998. Kim joined the faculty at University of Illinois at Chicago in 2002, and then moved to MIT in 2007.

Recognition
In 2015 she was elected as a fellow of the American Mathematical Society "for contributions to the representation theory of semisimple groups over nonarchimedean local fields and for service to the profession."

Personal
Her husband, Paul Seidel, is also a mathematician at MIT.

References

1969 births
Living people
20th-century South Korean mathematicians
South Korean women mathematicians
20th-century American mathematicians
21st-century American mathematicians
American women mathematicians
KAIST alumni
Yale University alumni
Massachusetts Institute of Technology School of Science faculty
Fellows of the American Mathematical Society
20th-century women mathematicians
21st-century women mathematicians
20th-century American women scientists
21st-century American women scientists